The Greenock Academy was a mixed non-denominational school in the west end of Greenock, Scotland, founded in 1855, originally independent, later a grammar school with a primary department, and finally a Comprehensive school only for ages eleven to eighteen. On 24 June 2011, Greenock Academy closed after a history spanning 156 years. Between 2012 and 2015, the school became the filming location of BBC One's school drama Waterloo Road.

History
The Greenock Academy was opened as a fee paying secondary and primary establishment in September 1855 in Nelson Street, Greenock. The school lay at this central Greenock location for almost a century of its lifetime before the building was demolished and moved to a modern building in Madeira Street of Greenock's west end, on the site of the old Balclutha mansion. The Nelson Street site is now occupied by the Finnart Campus of James Watt College. The new Academy featured both a secondary and primary school with the later named 'south wing' area being the primary school. On 29 December 1968 BBC Scotland's version of Songs of Praise came from the school; the rest of the UK saw it from Holy Trinity Platt Church in Rusholme, Manchester. The school had a yacht club, and competed in the Clark Cup of Mudhook Yacht Club at Helensburgh. Another similar school with a yacht club was Rothesay Academy on the Isle of Bute.

On 4 April 2015, the final stage in the school's history was brought forth as the demolition of the Madeira Street building was announced as being scheduled in September 2015, at an estimated cost of £164,000, following the end of filming use in the then anticipated date of May 2014. Plans for demolition appeared to be brought forward, however, as work began on flattening the former school in February 2015. Future potential use of the Greenock Academy site is currently unknown, but it will be sold off by the council for redevelopment - the Glenpark Early Learning Centre was constructed at the top of the site and completed in 2018.

Comprehensive

The primary department was abolished in 1976 and the lower door handles and alphabet tiles still remained into the years as a secondary school. The Madeira Street campus remained open through into the new millennium as Greenock Academy clocked up its 150th year in 2005. Three years later, the school was named as the best non-denominational school in Scotland and still remained within the top 10% of Scottish secondary schools long after the announcement. The disrepair of the ageing building overthrew the academic performance of the academy and in 2011 the school prepared to close after 156 years in service. The Greenock Academy and Gourock High School merged into a new school in the Bayhill area of Gourock. The new school, on the site previously occupied by St Columba's High School, Gourock, is known as Clydeview Academy and opened in 2011.

Waterloo Road
On 27 October 2011, the BBC announced that they had selected the Madeira Street building of Greenock Academy to film a new series of the TV drama Waterloo Road, following the production's move up north to nearby Glasgow. The site was leased from Inverclyde Council. On 2 April 2014, it was announced that the 10th series of Waterloo Road was to be the last as the BBC "believe it has reached the end of its lifecycle". Filming concluded on the set in August 2014.

Rectors of the Greenock Academy
The principals of the Greenock Academy always had the title of 'Rector'. As of 2008, Alan McDougall and Moira McColl are the only two surviving individuals to have held the post. Upon the merger of Greenock Academy and Gourock High School, a new principal was appointed, Mr William Todd, who remains the incumbent Rector of Clydeview Academy.

Notable teachers
 Colin Campbell, SNP MSP for West of Scotland (taught from 1967–73)
 Daniel Turner Holmes
 William King Gillies
 James Brunton Stephens, poet
 Alexander Graham Bell taught in the school for a year.
 William McLachlan Dewar CBE FRSE, headmaster in the 1930s

Notable alumni

 Scottie McClue (Colin Lamont), radio presenter and broadcaster
 Malcolm Offord, financier and politician

Grammar school
 Sir Dugald Baird, Regius Professor of Midwifery in the University of Aberdeen
 George Blake, author
 William Carnie, cricketer
 Walter Clarke Buchanan, politician
 Edward Caird, Master of Balliol College, Oxford, from 1893 to 1907
 John Caird, theologian
 Alexander Carmichael, writer
 Jack Clark, cricketer
 Ross Finnie, Liberal Democrat MSP from 1999–2011 for West of Scotland
 Right Rev. Archibald Fleming, first Bishop of The Arctic
 Annabel Goldie, Conservative MSP since 1999 for West Scotland, and former Leader of the Scottish Conservative Party
 Robert Hodge, cricketer and badminton player
 Colin Lamont, actor, writer, teacher
 Allan Macartney, Scottish National Party MEP from 1994 to 1998 for North East Scotland
 Very Rev. John McIndoe, Moderator of the General Assembly of the Church of Scotland for 1996–1997
 Air Marshal Sir Harold Whittingham CBE, pathologist, Director-General of RAF Medical Services and Director of Medical Services of BOAC
Richard Wilson (born 1936), actor 
 David Wright Young, Labour MP for Bolton South East and later for Bolton East

References

External links

 Greenock Academy's page on Scottish Schools Online 
 Greenock Academicals - the Accies

News items
 Show racism the red card, National 1st prize winner Fiona MacGregor from Greenock Academy receives her prizes from Scotland Manager Alex McLeish & EIS President Peter Quigley.
 Pupil wins management award

Defunct secondary schools in Inverclyde
Educational institutions established in 1855
Educational institutions disestablished in 2011
Waterloo Road (TV series)
1855 establishments in Scotland
2011 disestablishments in Scotland
Buildings and structures in Greenock
Buildings and structures demolished in 2015